Rila may refer to:

 Rila, the highest mountain range of Bulgaria and the Balkans
 Rila (town), a town in Rila Municipality, Kyustendil Province, Bulgaria
 Rila Municipality
 Rila, Tibet, a village in the Tibet Autonomous Region of China
 Rila Monastery, the largest Eastern Orthodox monastery in Bulgaria
 Rila River
 Rila National Park
 Répertoire international de la littérature de l'art, an index of art periodicals

See also
Rhode Island Light Artillery in the American Civil War